The Rise of Renegade X is a young adult novel written by Chelsea M. Campbell. It was originally published by Egmont USA and later republished by Golden City Publishing. The first book in the Renegade X series, it chronicles the adventures of Damien Locke, a teen supervillain whose evil plans are ruined when he discovers his long-lost father is actually a good-deed doing superhero.

Reception
The Rise of Renegade X has been reviewed by Publishers Weekly, that called it a "solid debut", and "a witty tale", School Library Journal. Horn Book Guides, and The Bulletin of the Center for Children's Books,

References

External links 

Author Website
Egmont USA

2010 American novels
American young adult novels
Superhero novels
Egmont Books books